Har Do Ab (also Romanized as Har Do Āb) is a village in Amlash-e Jonubi Rural District, in the Central District of Amlash County, Gilan Province, Iran. At the 2006 census, its population was 291, in 75 families.

References 

Populated places in Amlash County